"The Other Guy" is a song by Australian soft rock band Little River Band. It was released in February 1983 as the third and final single from the band's 1982 Greatest Hits album. The song also introduced the band's new lead vocalist, John Farnham, who replaced Glenn Shorrock.

"The Other Guy" peaked at number 20 on the Australian Kent Music Report singles chart.  It peaked at number 11 on the U.S. Billboard Hot 100 and number eight on the Cash Box Top 100.

Billboard said it has "a chunkier rhythm and more punch than their characteristic smooth sound, but the vocals are instantly recognizable."

Track listings
 Australian 7" (Capitol Records – CP-918)
A. "The Other Guy" - 2:53
B. "Take It Easy on Me" (Live) - 3:45

 New Zealand 7" (Capitol Records – F 5185)
A. "The Other Guy" - 2:49
B. "No More Tears" - 3:27	

 North America 7" (Capitol Records – B-5185)
A. "The Other Guy" - 2:49
B. "No More Tears" - 3:27

Charts

Weekly charts

Year-end charts

Cover versions
A cover by David Slater, released in 1988 as the second single from his debut album Exchange of Hearts, reached No. 30 on the Billboard Hot Country Songs chart.

References

External links
 

1983 singles
APRA Award winners
Little River Band songs
Capitol Records singles
EMI Records singles
1982 songs
Songs written by Graeham Goble